The European College of Kosovo, also referred to as ECK, is a higher education institution located in the center of Pristina, Kosovo.

History 
The college was established in 2013 by local and international professors and it is affiliated with the EU Business School, formerly known as European University in Barcelona.
For the academic year 2014/15 classes are taught in Albanian, and all the students are enrolled in bachelor's degree programs. For the academic year 2015/16 the European College of Kosovo's strategic plan is to open doors for international students and offer programs in English language too. European College of Kosovo main mission is "Creation of new European values, for a better future".

Training Centre and professional services is a special unit of the trainings and professional development in different scientific and professional fields within the European college of Kosovo.

International certifications and recognitions from the Centre for trainings and professional development of the European College of Kosovo:
Some of the international certifications and recognitions of trainings and testing for which the Centre of trainings and professional development of the European College of Kosovo is licensed are: Pearson Test of English General and Pearson Test of English young Learners.

Programs  
Economics and Managements (180)
Spezialization:
Management
Banking, Finance and Accounting
Information Technology in Business
General Law (240)
General Law

See also 
 EU Business School
 Pristina
 Kosovo

Notes

References

Private universities and colleges in Europe
Universities and colleges in Kosovo
Buildings and structures in Pristina
Education in Pristina